Abernathy, a chiefly North American variation of the surname Abernethy, may refer to:

 Anne Abernathy (born 1953), American luger
 Ben Abernathy, American editor
 Brent Abernathy (born 1977), American baseball player
 Charles F. Abernathy (born 1946), American law professor
 Constance Abernathy (1931–1994), American architect and jeweller
 Donzaleigh Abernathy (born 1967), American actress
 Frankie Abernathy (1981–2007), American castmate on MTV's The Real World: San Diego
Irvin Abernathy (1852-1925), American politician and member of the Mississippi House of Representatives
 Jack Abernathy (1876–1941), United States Marshall
 Juanita Abernathy (1931–2019), American civil rights activist
 Kathleen Q. Abernathy (born 1956), Commissioner of the United States Federal Communications Commission from 2001 to 2005
 Louis and Temple Abernathy, children of Jack Abernathy
 Micah Abernathy (born 1997), American football player
 Ralph Abernathy (1926–1990), American civil rights leader
 Ralph David Abernathy III (1959–2016), American politician
Robert Abernathy (1917–1997), American baseball player
 Robert Abernathy (1924–1990), American science fiction writer
 Ted Abernathy (1933–2004), American baseball player
 William J. Abernathy (1933–1983), US-American business professor
Woody Abernathy (1908–1961), American baseball player
Woody Abernathy (1915–1994), American baseball player

See also 
 Abernethy (surname)
 Abernathyite

References

Scottish surnames